EH-domain containing 2, also known as EHD2, is a human gene belonging to the EHD protein family.

References

Further reading

External links 
 

EH-domain-containing proteins